Cycas chevalieri is a species of cycad in central Vietnam, including in Nghe An Province. It may also occur in Laos.

References

chevalieri
Plants described in 1931